Oscar Rodríguez Naranjo (1907–2006) was a painter from Socorro, Santander Department, Colombia. His works include mainly oil paintings and sculptures.

Rodríguez Naranjo studied at the Escuela Nacional de Bellas Artes in Bogotá. Owing to the talent he displayed he was able to obtain scholarships for the Académie Julian and the Académie de la Grande Chaumière in Paris.

He came back from France during the Second World War and settled in Bucaramanga. Rodríguez Naranjo taught at the art school while he made a number of paintings that would build up his reputation in Colombia. In 1941 he became the Director of the Academia de Bellas Artes in Bucaramanga.

The main themes of his paintings were portraits, including religious figures, nudes and landscapes. Rodríguez Naranjo was one of the most outstanding and representative artists of the Colombian Santander region.

Sculptures
Some of Rodríguez Naranjo's most notable sculptures are:
José Antonio Galán statue, located in the main park in Socorro
María Antonia Santos Plata, one of the great figures of the Colombian Independence Struggle, sculpture, located in the main park in San Gil

Exhibitions and Public Collections
These are some of his most important collections:
1929: Casa del Estudiante, Bogotá
1931: I Salón de Artistas Colombianos, Bogotá
1933: Centro de Historia de Santander, Bucaramanga
1938: Académie Julian Yearly Exhibition, Paris, France
1943: Muestra Annual, Academia de Bellas Artes, Colegio Santander, Bucaramanga
1945: Muestra de la Academia de Bellas Artes, Bucaramanga
1951: Museo de Antioquia, Medellín
1959: Exposición de Artistas Santandereanos, Bucaramanga
1963: Banco de la República, Bucaramanga.
1975: Paisaje, Museo de Arte Moderno (MAM), Bogotá
1981: Antología 365 años de Pintura en Santander, Corporación Cultural Luis Perú De la Croix, Bucaramanga.
1981: Retrospectiva, Retratos, Cámara de Comercio, Bucaramanga
1983: Artistas del Socorro, Casa de la Cultura, El Socorro, Santander.
1987: Paisaje en Santander, Banco de la República, Bucaramanga.
1994: Forma y Color Colombia, Hotel La Fontana, Bogotá.
2006: Forma y Color Colombia, Galería Actualidad, Bucaramanga

Bibliography
Dario Ortiz, Oscar Rodríguez Naranjo, the painter of beauty (1996)

References

External links 
Oscar Rodríguez Naranjo, pintor 
Colarte - Oscar Rodríguez Naranjo sculpture
Rodríguez Naranjo, Banco de la República. Area Cultural de Bucaramanga; Editor: Julio César Flórez. 1988

1907 births
Colombian sculptors
2006 deaths
Alumni of the Académie de la Grande Chaumière
Académie Julian alumni
20th-century sculptors
20th-century Colombian painters
20th-century Colombian male artists
People from Santander Department
Colombian male painters